OTS or OTs is an acronym or nickname. Ots is a name.

OTS

Business 
 Ocean Therapy Solutions, U.S. company making centrifuge pumps for oceanic oil spill cleanup
 Operator Training Simulator, a simulation platform for industrial operator training
 "Opportunity to see", a measure of the penetration of advertising

Entertainment 
 Orchestra at Temple Square, an LDS orchestra located in Salt Lake City
 Over the shoulder shot, a film technique

Government 
 Office of Tax Simplification, a United Kingdom Treasury tax office
 Office of the Technical Services, or Technical Services Staff, a division of the Central Intelligence Agency
 Office of Thrift Supervision, a U.S. Treasury Department agency
 Office of Transport Security (Australia)
 Organization of Turkic States, international organization comprising prominent independent Turkic countries

Military 
 Air Force Officer Training School, a U.S. Air Force training center
 Officers' Training School RAAF, a Royal Australian Air Force training center
 Officers Training School, Bahtoo, a Myanmar army training centre

Science 
 Octadecyltrichlorosilane, a chemical forming self-assembled monolayers
 Orbital Test Satellite, a European Space Agency program
 Organization for Tropical Studies, a U.S.-based group of biological research stations in Costa Rica
 TsO (tosylate), the anion of p-toluenesulfonic acid, a tosyl compound

Technology 
 OpenTimestamps, a cryptographic timestamping standard

Religion
 Orthodox Theological Seminary, Kottayam, a seminary under the Indian Orthodox Church

Ots 
 Georg Ots (1920–1975), Estonian musician
 MS Georg Ots, a ferry named for Georg Ots
 Otš, Tatar-language name of the Izh River in Tatarstan, Russia

Other uses 
 Order of the Solar Temple, a French esoteric sect
 Ohr Torah Stone institutions
 OTS, IATA code for Anacortes Airport in Anacortes, Washington

See also

 Off-the-shelf (disambiguation)